The 1884 Kaiapoi by-election was a by-election held on 16 May 1884 during the 8th New Zealand Parliament in the Canterbury electorate of .

The by-election was caused by the resignation of the incumbent MP Isaac Wilson on 7 April 1884.

The by-election was won by Edward Richardson, who was unopposed (although earlier J. Lowthian Wilson had considered to stand).

Notes

Kaiapoi 1884
1884 elections in New Zealand
Politics of Canterbury, New Zealand
May 1884 events